Elmer Boyd Smith (May 31, 1860 – October 5, 1943) was an American writer and illustrator of children's books and painter.

Smith was born in Saint John, New Brunswick and studied art in Paris with Gustave Boulanger and Jules Joseph Lefebvre at the Académie Julian from 1881 to 1884, and also with H. Lefort for several years. In the early 1900s he moved to Wilton, Connecticut, where he spent the remainder of his life. He illustrated more than seventy books for both adults and children, beginning with My Village in 1896, written while he was living in France. His first children's book was The Story of Noah's Ark in 1905.

Selected works
 The Story of Noah’s Ark, 1905
 The Circus, 1909
 Robinson Crusoe, 1909
 Early Life of Mr. Man Before Noah, 1914
 After They Came Out of the Ark: Completing the Story of Noah, 1918
 The Story of Our Country, 1920
 Fun In the Radio World, 1923
 The Country Book, 1924
 So Long Ago, 1944

References

External links

 
 Chicken World
 The Farm Book
 The Story of Pocahontas and Captain John Smith
 The Railroad Book
 The Seashore book
 Online books by Elmer Boyd Smith
 Illustrations from In the Days of Giants: a book of Norse tales
 MyNDIR (My Norse Digital Image repository) illustrations by Elmer Boyd Smith from In the Days of Giants. Clicking on the thumbnail will give you the full image and information concerning it.

1860 births
1943 deaths
American writers
American illustrators
Writers from Saint John, New Brunswick